Gnorismoneura micronca is a species of moth of the family Tortricidae. It is found in Yunnan, China.

References

	

Moths described in 1937
Archipini